William Malcolm Mott (18 December 1894 – 26 November 1961) was a Liberal party member of the House of Commons of Canada. He was born in Dartmouth, Nova Scotia and became an electrician by career and president of Mott Electric Company.

He was first elected to Parliament at the New Westminster riding in a by-election on 24 October 1949, after incumbent Thomas Reid was appointed to the Senate. Mott was defeated in the 1953 election by George Hahn of the Social Credit party.

Mott was also mayor of New Westminster, British Columbia from 1942 to 1948, after serving as alderman there between 1936 and 1940. In 1947 and 1948, he was president of the Union of British Columbia Municipalities. Mott Crescent in the municipality's Victory Heights sector was named in his honour.

References

External links
 

1894 births
1961 deaths
Liberal Party of Canada MPs
Mayors of New Westminster
Members of the House of Commons of Canada from British Columbia
People from Dartmouth, Nova Scotia